Jacob 'Jack' Moses Borgenicht (1911-2005) was an American entrepreneur, land use preservation activist, garment manufacturer, millionaire, restaurant owner, philanthropist and the oldest person to climb Mount Rainier at the age of 81.

Biography 
He was born Jacob Moses Borgenicht to a Jewish family in Manhattan, New York. He was the youngest of 14 siblings born to prominent garment manufacturers Regina and Louis Borgenicht. He spent two years attending New York University.

Career 
He dropped out of college during the Great Depression to help the family clothing manufacturing company Borgenicht and Spiro. He formed his own company, Jack Borgenicht Inc., in 1944.

Mountain climbing 
Starting at the age of 78, Borgenicht and his climbing partner, College of William and Mary kinesiology professor Ken Kambis, climbed Mount Elbert and on August 30, 1992, he became the oldest person to climb Mount Rainier at age 81, with additional plans to climb Mount Kiliminjaro and Mount Everest.

Marriage and children 
Borgenicht was married four times; once to Grace Borgenicht Brandt (m. 1938) art gallery owner, and then three others. On March 26, 1954, he married Peri Gilbert Borgenicht Winkler, stockbroker, literary agent; they divorced in 1964. He then married Dale Borgenicht Blum, award and antique shop owner. His fourth wife was Fran Bennett Borgenicht (m. 1995) Broadway producer. He had twelve children including ceramic artist Ruth Borgenicht and painter Lois Borgenicht.

Legacy 
On his death, he arranged to make multi-million dollar charitable donations to the College of William and Mary to fund the Foundation for Aging Studies and Exercise Science Research and a Hypoxia/Altitude Physiology Research Facility

Five years after his death, the New Jersey Conservation Foundation and its partners, including the Morris County Open Space Trust Fund, bought his 228-acre estate in Long Valley, New Jersey for $2.8 million for open space preservation.

Philosophical and/or political views 
Borgenicht has stated that The Anatomy of Peace by Emery Reves expresses his philosophy best. Winston Churchill and Yasser Arafat were his role models.

Further reading 
 Outliers by Malcolm Gladwell (Chapter 5)
 Borgenicht, Louis. (1942).  The Happiest Man: The Life of Louis Borgenicht, as told to Harold Friedman. New York: G.P. Putnam's Sons.
 Louis Borgenicht: How to Do Meaningful Work that Matters by Dean Yeong

References

1911 births
2005 deaths
20th-century American businesspeople
20th-century American Jews
American rock climbers
People from Washington Township, Morris County, New Jersey
Borgenicht family
21st-century American Jews